Neander Montgomery Woods Jr. (1876 - 1956) was an architect in Memphis, Tennessee and in the northeastern United States including New York City, New Jersey, and Connecticut. His most well known building is the Exchange Building in Memphis. His work is noted along with a few other architects on a historical marker in the Central Gardens Historic District. George Mahan Jr. apprenticed with him as did Everett Woods, his younger brother who also became an architect.

Woods father was Rev. Neander M. Woods Sr. who was born in Kentucky September 1842. Woods Sr wrote a book about the family's Scottish ancestry, The Woods-Mcafee Memorial. Woods Sr. died April 15 1910 in Louisville, Kentucky and is buried at Cave Hill Cemetery in the city.

Woods Jr. authored the 80 page Art house printing co. publication The most house for the least money (1921).

Work
Neander Woods home (1909) at 1521 Peabody Avenue in the Central Gardens area of Memphis. The third home he designed for himself.
665 North Trezevant Street in Hein Park, Memphis.
Exchange Building (1910) 9 North 2nd Street. The tallest building in Memphis for 20 years after its completion.
N. Montgomery Woods House 1400 South Wanamassa Dr. in Wanamassa, New Jersey. Also known as the Mushroom House. A "symphony in brown" according to Woods.

References

Further reading
Memphis, and Architectural Guide by Eugene J. Johnson
Obituary, New York Times (link needed)

1876 births
Architects from Tennessee
People from Memphis, Tennessee
1956 deaths
20th-century American architects
American people of Scottish descent
Burials at Cave Hill Cemetery